Rhona Clarke (born 21 January 1958) is an Irish composer and pedagogue.

Biography
Rhona Clarke was born in Dublin and comes from a musical family. She sang in a women's choir from age 14 and was an outstanding piano pupil at the College of Music (now the DIT Conservatory of Music and Drama), Dublin. She studied music at University College Dublin (Teacher's Diploma, 1978; BMus 1980) and taught at a number of schools in the Dublin area. When she participated in the Ennis Composition Summer School in 1985 she was introduced to the music of continental composers such as Luciano Berio and Witold Lutoslawski, which left a lasting impression. Some of her early works received awards, such as the Six Short Piano Pieces (1982), which won the composition prize of the Feis Ceoil, and the choral work Suantraí Ghráinne (1983), which won the Seán Ó Riada Memorial Trophy at the 1984 Cork Choral Festival. For Sisyphus (1985) for flute, clarinet and string trio she received the Varming Prize, which is awarded only every four years to an Irish composer under the age of 30. Clarke completed her first orchestral score in 1991 (A Great Rooted Tree). In 1992 she received a Ph.D. from Queen's University Belfast. She is a lecturer in music at St. Patrick's College, Dublin City University.

Clarke has received commissions from RTÉ, the Cork International Choral Festival, Concorde, Music Network and the National Concert Hall, among others. Her work has been performed and broadcast throughout Ireland and worldwide. In January 2014, she was the featured composer in the Horizon Series of contemporary music by the Irish national broadcaster RTÉ. For this event, the RTÉ National Symphony Orchestra commissioned her orchestral composition SHIFT (2013). Since 2009 she has been collaborating with visual artist Marie Hanlon, including short experimental films with music, live music with visual projections and joint exhibitions; a recent example (July–September 2014) being the joint exhibition DIC TAT at the Gallery Draíocht, Blanchardstown, Dublin.

Rhona Clarke is a member of Aosdána, Ireland's state-sponsored academy of creative artists.

Music
Rhona Clarke's output includes choral, chamber, orchestral and electronic works. Her calm and evocative music in the early Suantraí Ghráinne created some curiosity at its 1984 performance. Early chamber works such as Sisyphus (1985) and Purple Dust are characterised by wide-spaced harmonic settings of a rather sparse tonal material. Some aleatoric passages alternate with more strictly notated pitches and a rather limited degree of dissonance. In Gloria Deo (1988) for soprano, mixed chorus and orchestra she combined modal influences from Renaissance music with free atonality. Since the early 1990s she has been exploring the possibilities of electro-acoustic music, winning an award at the 1992 Dublin Film Festival for her electronic score Whaling Afloat and Ashore. Her recent orchestral score SHIFT reflects her experiences in electro-acoustic processes: "Extended techniques, deliberately avoided in previous work, are embraced here using harmonics and noise elements in strings, and bowed, timbral effects on percussion. In a single, fifteen-minute movement, transformations in colour and texture vary from slow and intense in the opening section, to sudden and harsh later in the piece."

Selected works

Orchestral
A Great Rooted Tree (1991)
Everything Passes (1997)
Where the Clouds Go (2005)
SHIFT (2013)

Choral with orchestra or ensemble
Gloria Deo (1988)
Triptych (1990)
Missa (1999)
Sympathy (2000)
Street Dancer (2010)

Choral unaccompanied
Suantraí Ghráinne (1983)
Psalm 148 (1988)
A Song for St Cecilia's Day (1991)
Rorate caeli (1994)
Two Marian Anthems (2007)
Veni Creator (2010)
Three Carols on Medieval Texts (2014)
Ave atque vale (2017)
O vis aeternitatis (2020)
Requiem (2020)

Chamber music
Sisyphus (1985) for flute, clarinet, violin, viola, cello
Purple Dust (1987) for flute, violin, piano
Magnificat (1990) for string quartet
SoundWorks for Young Players: two suites (1994, 1995) for 3–5 variable instruments

 The Waterford Suite (1997)
 Prelude and Labyrinth for violin and piano
 Jealous Pursuit for viola and piano
 Resolution and Carousel for cello and piano
 Then / Now for 2 pianos
Undercurrent (2001) for violin, viola, cello, piano
Piano Trio No. 2 (2001, rev. 2007)
Piano Trio No. 3 (2002)
Pas de Quatre (2009) for string quartet
A Different Game: Piano Trio No. 4 (2016)

Solo instrumental
Five Short Piano Solos (1999)
For Íde (1999, rev. 2002), versions for flute or recorder
In Umbra (2000), cello
Béal Dearg (2001), piano
Drift - Knot (2002), guitar
Tread Softly (2005), piano
Four Pieces for Solo Flute (2006)
Eight Improvisations (2006), treble instr. ad lib
Prelude (2010, rev. 2012), organ

Electro-acoustic music
Whaling Afloat and Ashore (1991)
City with No Name (1992)
Pied Piper (1994)
con coro (2011) includes vn, vc
as if nothing had happened (2012) includes vc
Lines & Spaces (2013), video
smiling like that ... (2015), with mezzo-soprano

Recordings
 The Old Men Admiring Themselves in the Water and Autobiography, from Five Songs (1998), performed by Judith Mok (soprano) and Dearbhla Collins (piano), on: Hugh Lane November Series 1998, Association of Irish Composers AIC 001 (promotional CD, 1999).
 The Old Men Admiring Themselves in the Water, from Five Songs (1998), performed by Judith Mok (soprano) and Dearbhla Collins (piano), on: Contemporary Music from Ireland Vol. 3, Contemporary Music Centre CMC CD03 (CD, 2001).
 Reflection on the Sixth Station of the Cross (2001), performed by members of the Tiroler Ensemble für Neue Musik, on: Contemporary Music from Ireland Vol. 6, Contemporary Music Centre CMC CD06 (CD, 2006). 
 Tread Softly (2005), performed by Maria McGarry (piano), on: Hiccup: RTÉ Lyric fm Commissions 2002–2008, RTÉ lyric fm CD123 (CD, 2009).
 Four Pieces for Solo Flute (2006), performed by William Dowdall, on: Breathe: New Notes for Flute from Ireland and New Zealand 1978-2010, Atoll Records acd 111 (CD, 2010). Available from Contemporary Music Centre, Dublin.
 Piano Trio No. 2, performed by Fidelio Trio, on: Dancing in Daylight: Contemporary Piano Trios from Ireland, Metier MSV 28556 (CD, 2015).
 smiling like that ..., performed by Aylish Kerrigan (mezzo) with tape, on: Métier MSV 28558 (CD, 2016).
 Purple Dust, performed by Concorde, on: RTÉ lyric fm CD 153 (CD, 2016).
 Piano Trio No. 3; Gleann dá loch; Piano Trio. No. 2; Con coro; Piano Trio No. 4 (A Different Game); In umbra, performed by Fidelio Trio, on: Métier MSV 28561 (CD, 2016).
 Sempertinam: Choral Music by Rhona Clarke, performed by State Choir Latvija, Māris Sirmais (cond.), on Métier MSV 28614 (CD, 2022). Contains: A Song for St Cecilia's Day; Rorate caeli; Do Not Stand At My Grave and Weep; Two Marian Anthems; The Kiss; Three Carols on Medieval Texts; The Old Woman; Ave atque vale; O vis aeternitatis; Requiem.

Bibliography
Axel Klein: Die Musik Irlands im 20. Jahrhundert (Hildesheim: Georg Olms, 1996), pp. 375–6.

References

External links
Composer's website.
Representation at Contemporary Music Centre, Dublin.

1958 births
20th-century classical composers
20th-century women composers
21st-century classical composers
21st-century women composers
Alumni of Queen's University Belfast
Alumni of University College Dublin
Aosdána members
Electroacoustic music composers
Women classical composers
Irish classical composers
Irish women classical composers
Living people
Musicians from Dublin (city)
People associated with Dublin City University